Reginald Stanley Bartholomew (February 17, 1936 – August 26, 2012) was an American diplomat who served as U.S. Ambassador to Lebanon (1983–1986), Spain (1986–1989), and Italy (1993–1997). He was also a member of the American Academy of Diplomacy and Council on Foreign Relations. Additionally, he was also a member of the United States National Security Council staff (1977–1979).

Education and early career
Bartholomew earned a bachelor's degree in history and political science from Dartmouth College in 1958 and a master's degree in political science from the University of Chicago. He later returned to the University of Chicago to teach social sciences and government. Bartholomew taught at Wesleyan University as well, from 1964 to 1968. While there, he met and befriended current President Emeritus of the Council on Foreign Relations, Leslie H. Gelb, then a fellow instructor. In 1967, Gelb left to work as a policy adviser at the Pentagon, persuading Bartholomew to join him the following year. Both occupied various departments in different roles, with Bartholomew working at the National Security Council during the Carter administration and later succeeding Gelb as the director of politico-military affairs at the State Department.

Diplomatic career 
Prior to his first ambassadorship, Bartholomew spent 15 years advising presidents and secretaries of state, most notably playing a key role in the SALT II arms limitation talks with the Soviet Union in 1979.

In 1983, Bartholomew was appointed ambassador to Lebanon. In the following years, terrorists bombed the newly constructed United States Embassy, as well as a Marine barracks. The escalating violence pressured the United States to pull its troops from the region. Under Bartholomew's advisement however, President Reagan delayed ordering the withdrawal until February 1984.

Bartholomew was appointed ambassador to Spain in 1986, where he led negotiations to preserve a greatly reduced military presence. He had worked on similar negotiations before and would again later, in Italy, where he served as ambassador from 1993 to 1997.

Upon retirement, he joined Merrill Lynch Investment Banking as Vice-Chairman Europe and Chairman Italy (1997–2011).

Bartholomew died from cancer in New York City, on August 26, 2012, at the age of 76. His survivors include his wife of 56 years, Rose-Anne (née Dognin), four children, a brother, and seven grandchildren.

References

External links

1936 births
2012 deaths
Deaths from cancer in New York (state)
People from Portland, Maine
Wesleyan University faculty
Ambassadors of the United States to Lebanon
Ambassadors of the United States to Italy
Ambassadors of the United States to Spain
United States Under Secretaries of State
Dartmouth College alumni
University of Chicago alumni
University of Chicago faculty
20th-century American diplomats